A superheterodyne receiver, often shortened to superhet, is a type of radio receiver that uses frequency mixing to convert a received signal to a fixed intermediate frequency (IF) which can be more conveniently processed than the original carrier frequency. It was long believed to have been invented by US engineer Edwin Armstrong, but after some controversy the earliest patent for the invention is now credited to French radio engineer and radio manufacturer Lucien Lévy. Virtually all modern radio receivers use the superheterodyne principle; except software-defined radios, which use direct sampling.

History

Heterodyne 
Early Morse code radio broadcasts were produced using an alternator connected to a spark gap. The output signal was at a carrier frequency defined by the physical construction of the gap, modulated by the alternating current signal from the alternator. Since the output frequency of the alternator was generally in the audible range, this produces an audible amplitude modulated (AM) signal. Simple radio detectors filtered out the high-frequency carrier, leaving the modulation, which was passed on to the user's headphones as an audible signal of dots and dashes.

In 1904, Ernst Alexanderson introduced the Alexanderson alternator, a device that directly produced radio frequency output with higher power and much higher efficiency than the older spark gap systems. In contrast to the spark gap, however, the output from the alternator was a pure carrier wave at a selected frequency. When detected on existing receivers, the dots and dashes would normally be inaudible, or "supersonic". Due to the filtering effects of the receiver, these signals generally produced a click or thump, which were audible but made determining dot or dash difficult.

In 1905, Canadian inventor Reginald Fessenden came up with the idea of using two Alexanderson alternators operating at closely spaced frequencies to broadcast two signals, instead of one. The receiver would then receive both signals, and as part of the detection process, only the beat frequency would exit the receiver. By selecting two carriers close enough that the beat frequency was audible, the resulting Morse code could once again be easily heard even in simple receivers. For instance, if the two alternators operated at frequencies 3 kHz apart, the output in the headphones would be dots or dashes of 3 kHz tone, making them easily audible.

Fessenden coined the term "heterodyne", meaning "generated by a difference" (in frequency), to describe this system. The word is derived from the Greek roots hetero- "different", and -dyne "power".

Regeneration
Morse code was widely used in the early days of radio because it was both easy to produce and easy to receive.  In contrast to voice broadcasts, the output of the amplifier didn't have to closely match the modulation of the original signal.  As a result, any number of simple amplification systems could be used. One method used an interesting side-effect of early triode amplifier tubes. If both the plate (anode) and grid were connected to resonant circuits tuned to the same frequency and the stage gain was much higher than unity, stray capacitive coupling between the grid and the plate would cause the amplifier to go into oscillation.

In 1913, Edwin Howard Armstrong described a receiver system that used this effect to produce audible Morse code output using a single triode. The output of the amplifier taken at the anode was connected back to the input through a "tickler", causing feedback that drove input signals well beyond unity. This caused the output to oscillate at a chosen frequency with great amplification. When the original signal cut off at the end of the dot or dash, the oscillation decayed and the sound disappeared after a short delay.

Armstrong referred to this concept as a regenerative receiver, and it immediately became one of the most widely used systems of its era. Many radio systems of the 1920s were based on the regenerative principle, and it continued to be used in specialized roles into the 1940s, for instance in the IFF Mark II.

RDF
There was one role where the regenerative system was not suitable, even for Morse code sources, and that was the task of radio direction finding, or RDF.

The regenerative system was highly non-linear, amplifying any signal above a certain threshold by a huge amount, sometimes so large it caused it to turn into a transmitter (which was the entire concept behind IFF). In RDF, the strength of the signal is used to determine the location of the transmitter, so one requires linear amplification to allow the strength of the original signal, often very weak, to be accurately measured.

To address this need, RDF systems of the era used triodes operating below unity. To get a usable signal from such a system, tens or even hundreds of triodes had to be used, connected together anode-to-grid. These amplifiers drew enormous amounts of power and required a team of maintenance engineers to keep them running. Nevertheless, the strategic value of direction finding on weak signals was so high that the British Admiralty felt the high cost was justified.

Superheterodyne

Although a number of researchers discovered the superheterodyne concept, filing patents only months apart (see below), American engineer Edwin Armstrong is often credited with the concept. He came across it while considering better ways to produce RDF receivers. He had concluded that moving to higher "short wave" frequencies would make RDF more useful and was looking for practical means to build a linear amplifier for these signals. At the time, short wave was anything above about 500 kHz, beyond any existing amplifier's capabilities.

It had been noticed that when a regenerative receiver went into oscillation, other nearby receivers would start picking up other stations as well. Armstrong (and others) eventually deduced that this was caused by a "supersonic heterodyne" between the station's carrier frequency and the regenerative receiver's oscillation frequency. When the first receiver began to oscillate at high outputs, its signal would flow back out through the antenna to be received on any nearby receiver. On that receiver, the two signals mixed just as they did in the original heterodyne concept, producing an output that is the difference in frequency between the two signals.

For instance, consider a lone receiver that was tuned to a station at 300 kHz. If a second receiver is set up nearby and set to 400 kHz with high gain, it will begin to give off a 400 kHz signal that will be received in the first receiver. In that receiver, the two signals will mix to produce four outputs, one at the original 300 kHz, another at the received 400 kHz, and two more, the difference at 100 kHz and the sum at 700 kHz. This is the same effect that Fessenden had proposed, but in his system the two frequencies were deliberately chosen so the beat frequency was audible. In this case, all of the frequencies are well beyond the audible range, and thus "supersonic", giving rise to the name superheterodyne.

Armstrong realized that this effect was a potential solution to the "short wave" amplification problem, as the "difference" output still retained its original modulation, but on a lower carrier frequency. In the example above, one can amplify the 100 kHz beat signal and retrieve the original information from that, the receiver does not have to tune in the higher 300 kHz original carrier. By selecting an appropriate set of frequencies, even very high-frequency signals could be "reduced" to a frequency that could be amplified by existing systems.

For instance, to receive a signal at 1500 kHz, far beyond the range of efficient amplification at the time, one could set up an oscillator at, for example, 1560 kHz. Armstrong referred to this as the "local oscillator" or LO. As its signal was being fed into a second receiver in the same device, it did not have to be powerful, generating only enough signal to be roughly similar in strength to that of the received station. When the signal from the LO mixes with the station's, one of the outputs will be the heterodyne difference frequency, in this case, 60 kHz. He termed this resulting difference the "intermediate frequency" often abbreviated to "IF".
In December 1919, Major E. H. Armstrong gave publicity to an indirect method of obtaining short-wave amplification, called the super-heterodyne. The idea is to reduce the incoming frequency, which may be, for example 1,500,000 cycles (200 meters), to some suitable super-audible frequency that can be amplified efficiently, then passing this current through an intermediate frequency amplifier, and finally rectifying and carrying on to one or two stages of audio frequency amplification.

The "trick" to the superheterodyne is that by changing the LO frequency you can tune in different stations. For instance, to receive a signal at 1300 kHz, one could tune the LO to 1360 kHz, resulting in the same 60 kHz IF. This means the amplifier section can be tuned to operate at a single frequency, the design IF, which is much easier to do efficiently.

Development

Armstrong put his ideas into practice, and the technique was soon adopted by the military. It was less popular when commercial radio broadcasting began in the 1920s, mostly due to the need for an extra tube (for the oscillator), the generally higher cost of the receiver, and the level of skill required to operate it. For early domestic radios, tuned radio frequency receivers (TRF) were more popular because they were cheaper, easier for a non-technical owner to use, and less costly to operate. Armstrong eventually sold his superheterodyne patent to Westinghouse, which then sold it to Radio Corporation of America (RCA), the latter monopolizing the market for superheterodyne receivers until 1930.

Because the original motivation for the superhet was the difficulty of using the triode amplifier at high frequencies, there was an advantage in using a lower intermediate frequency. During this era, many receivers used an IF frequency of only 30 kHz. These low IF frequencies, often using IF transformers based on the self-resonance of iron-core transformers, had poor image frequency rejection, but overcame the difficulty in using triodes at radio frequencies in a manner that competed favorably with the less robust neutrodyne TRF receiver. Higher IF frequencies (455 kHz was a common standard) came into use in later years, after the invention of the tetrode and pentode as amplifying tubes, largely solving the problem of image rejection. Even later, however, low IF frequencies (typically 60 kHz) were again used in the second (or third) IF stage of double or triple-conversion communications receivers to take advantage of the selectivity more easily achieved at lower IF frequencies, with image-rejection accomplished in the earlier IF stage(s) which were at a higher IF frequency.

In the 1920s, at these low frequencies, commercial IF filters looked very similar to 1920s audio interstage coupling transformers, had similar construction, and were wired up in an almost identical manner, so they were referred to as "IF transformers". By the mid-1930s, superheterodynes using much higher intermediate frequencies (typically around 440–470 kHz) used tuned transformers more similar to other RF applications. The name "IF transformer" was retained, however, now meaning "intermediate frequency". Modern receivers typically use a mixture of ceramic resonators or surface acoustic wave resonators and traditional tuned-inductor IF transformers.

By the 1930s, improvements in vacuum tube technology rapidly eroded the TRF receiver's cost advantages, and the explosion in the number of broadcasting stations created a demand for cheaper, higher-performance receivers.

The introduction of an additional grid in a vacuum tube, but before the more modern screen-grid tetrode, included the tetrode with two control grids; this tube combined the mixer and oscillator functions, first used in the so-called autodyne mixer. This was rapidly followed by the introduction of tubes specifically designed for superheterodyne operation, most notably the pentagrid converter. By reducing the tube count (with each tube stage being the main factor affecting cost in this era), this further reduced the advantage of TRF and regenerative receiver designs.

By the mid-1930s, commercial production of TRF receivers was largely replaced by superheterodyne receivers.  By the 1940s, the vacuum-tube superheterodyne AM broadcast receiver was refined into a cheap-to-manufacture design called the "All American Five" because it used five vacuum tubes: usually a converter (mixer/local oscillator), an IF amplifier, a detector/audio amplifier, audio power amplifier, and a rectifier.  Since this time, the superheterodyne design was used for almost all commercial radio and TV receivers.

Patent battles
French engineer Lucien Lévy filed a patent application for the superheterodyne principle in August 1917 with brevet n° 493660. Armstrong also filed his patent in 1917.  Levy filed his original disclosure about seven months before Armstrong's.
German inventor Walter H. Schottky also filed a patent in 1918.

At first the US recognised Armstrong as the inventor, and his US Patent 1,342,885 was issued on 8 June 1920. After various changes and court hearings Lévy was awarded US patent No 1,734,938 that included seven of the nine claims in Armstrong's application, while the two remaining claims were granted to Alexanderson of GE and Kendall of AT&T.

Principle of operation

The diagram at right shows the block diagram of a typical single-conversion superheterodyne receiver. The diagram has blocks that are common to superheterodyne receivers, with only the RF amplifier being optional.

The antenna collects the radio signal. The tuned RF stage with optional RF amplifier provides some initial selectivity; it is necessary to suppress the image frequency (see below), and may also serve to prevent strong out-of-passband signals from saturating the initial amplifier. A local oscillator provides the mixing frequency; it is usually a variable frequency oscillator which is used to tune the receiver to different stations. The frequency mixer does the actual heterodyning that gives the superheterodyne its name; it changes the incoming radio frequency signal to a higher or lower, fixed, intermediate frequency (IF). The IF band-pass filter and amplifier supply most of the gain and the narrowband filtering for the radio. The demodulator extracts the audio or other modulation from the IF radio frequency. The extracted signal is then amplified by the audio amplifier.

Circuit description
To receive a radio signal, a suitable antenna is required. The output of the antenna may be very small, often only a few microvolts. The signal from the antenna is tuned and may be amplified in a so-called radio frequency (RF) amplifier, although this stage is often omitted. One or more tuned circuits at this stage block frequencies that are far removed from the intended reception frequency. To tune the receiver to a particular station, the frequency of the local oscillator is controlled by the tuning knob (for instance). Tuning of the local oscillator and the RF stage may use a variable capacitor, or varicap diode. The tuning of one (or more) tuned circuits in the RF stage must track the tuning of the local oscillator.

Local oscillator and mixer
The signal is then fed into a circuit where it is mixed with a sine wave from a variable frequency oscillator known as the local oscillator (LO). The mixer uses a non-linear component to produce both sum and difference beat frequencies signals, each one containing the modulation contained in the desired signal. The output of the mixer may include the original RF signal at fRF, the local oscillator signal at fLO, and the two new heterodyne frequencies fRF + fLO and fRF − fLO. The mixer may inadvertently produce additional frequencies such as third- and higher-order intermodulation products. Ideally, the IF bandpass filter removes all but the desired IF signal at fIF. The IF signal contains the original modulation (transmitted information) that the received radio signal had at fRF.

The frequency of the local oscillator fLO is set so the desired reception radio frequency fRF mixes to fIF. There are two choices for the local oscillator frequency because the dominant mixer products are at fRF ± fLO. If the local oscillator frequency is less than the desired reception frequency, it is called low-side injection (fIF = fRF − fLO); if the local oscillator is higher, then it is called high-side injection (fIF = fLO − fRF).

The mixer will process not only the desired input signal at fRF, but also all signals present at its inputs. There will be many mixer products (heterodynes). Most other signals produced by the mixer (such as due to stations at nearby frequencies) can be filtered out in the IF tuned amplifier; that gives the superheterodyne receiver its superior performance. However, if fLO is set to fRF + fIF, then an incoming radio signal at fLO + fIF will also produce a heterodyne at fIF; the frequency  fLO + fIF is called the image frequency and must be rejected by the tuned circuits in the RF stage. The image frequency is 2 fIF higher (or lower) than the desired frequency fRF, so employing a higher IF frequency fIF increases the receiver's image rejection without requiring additional selectivity in the RF stage.

To suppress the unwanted image, the tuning of the RF stage and the LO may need to "track" each other. In some cases, a narrow-band receiver can have a fixed tuned RF amplifier. In that case, only the local oscillator frequency is changed. In most cases, a receiver's input band is wider than its IF center frequency. For example, a typical AM broadcast band receiver covers 510 kHz to 1655 kHz (a roughly 1160 kHz input band) with a 455 kHz IF frequency; an FM broadcast band receiver covers 88 MHz to 108 MHz band with a 10.7 MHz IF frequency. In that situation, the RF amplifier must be tuned so the IF amplifier does not see two stations at the same time. If the AM broadcast band receiver LO were set at 1200 kHz, it would see stations at both 745 kHz (1200−455 kHz) and 1655 kHz. Consequently, the RF stage must be designed so that any stations that are twice the IF frequency away are significantly attenuated. The tracking can be done with a multi-section variable capacitor or some varactors driven by a common control voltage. An RF amplifier may have tuned circuits at both its input and its output, so three or more tuned circuits may be tracked. In practice, the RF and LO frequencies need to track closely but not perfectly.

In the days of tube (valve) electronics, it was common for superheterodyne receivers to combine the functions of the local oscillator and the mixer in a single tube, leading to a savings in power, size, and especially cost.  A single pentagrid converter tube would oscillate and also provide signal amplification as well as frequency mixing.

IF amplifier
The stages of an intermediate frequency amplifier ("IF amplifier" or "IF strip") are tuned to a fixed frequency that does not change as the receiving frequency changes. The fixed frequency simplifies optimization of the IF amplifier. The IF amplifier is selective around its center frequency fIF. The fixed center frequency allows the stages of the IF amplifier to be carefully tuned for best performance (this tuning is called "aligning" the IF amplifier). If the center frequency changed with the receiving frequency, then the IF stages would have had to track their tuning. That is not the case with the superheterodyne.

Normally, the IF center frequency fIF is chosen to be less than the range of desired reception frequencies fRF. That is because it is easier and less expensive to get high selectivity at a lower frequency using tuned circuits. The bandwidth of a tuned circuit with a certain Q is proportional to the frequency itself (and what's more, a higher Q is achievable at lower frequencies), so fewer IF filter stages are required to achieve the same selectivity. Also, it is easier and less expensive to get high gain at a lower frequencies.

However, in many modern receivers designed for reception over a wide frequency range (e.g. scanners and spectrum analyzers) a first IF frequency higher than the reception frequency is employed in a  double conversion configuration. For instance, the Rohde & Schwarz EK-070 VLF/HF receiver covers 10 kHz to 30 MHz. It has a band switched RF filter and mixes the input to a first IF of 81.4 MHz and a second IF frequency of 1.4 MHz. The first LO frequency is 81.4 to 111.4 MHz, a reasonable range for an oscillator. But if the original RF range of the receiver were to be converted directly to the 1.4 MHz intermediate frequency, the LO frequency would need to cover 1.4-31.4 MHz which cannot be accomplished using tuned circuits (a variable capacitor with a fixed inductor would need a capacitance range of 500:1). Image rejection is never an issue with such a high IF frequency. The first IF stage uses a crystal filter with a 12 kHz bandwidth. There is a second frequency conversion (making a triple-conversion receiver) that mixes the 81.4 MHz first IF with 80 MHz to create a 1.4 MHz second IF. Image rejection for the second IF is not an issue as the first IF has a bandwidth of much less than 2.8 MHz.

To avoid interference to receivers, licensing authorities will avoid assigning common IF frequencies to transmitting stations. Standard intermediate frequencies used are 455 kHz for medium-wave AM radio, 10.7 MHz for broadcast FM receivers, 38.9 MHz (Europe) or 45 MHz (US) for television, and 70 MHz for satellite and terrestrial microwave equipment. To avoid tooling costs associated with these components, most manufacturers then tended to design their receivers around a fixed range of frequencies offered, which resulted in a worldwide de facto standardization of intermediate frequencies.

In early superhets, the IF stage was often a regenerative stage providing the sensitivity and selectivity with fewer components. Such superhets were called super-gainers or regenerodynes. This is also called a Q multiplier, involving a small modification to an existing receiver especially for the purpose of increasing selectivity.

IF bandpass filter
The IF stage includes a filter and/or multiple tuned circuits to achieve the desired selectivity. This filtering must have a band pass equal to or less than the frequency spacing between adjacent broadcast channels. Ideally a filter would have a high attenuation to adjacent channels, but maintain a flat response across the desired signal spectrum in order to retain the quality of the received signal. This may be obtained using one or more dual tuned IF transformers, a quartz crystal filter, or a multipole ceramic crystal filter.

In the case of television receivers, no other technique was able to produce the precise bandpass characteristic needed for vestigial sideband reception, such as that used in the NTSC system first approved by the US in 1941. By the 1980s, multi-component capacitor-inductor filters had been replaced with precision electromechanical surface acoustic wave (SAW) filters. Fabricated by precision laser milling techniques, SAW filters are cheaper to produce, can be made to extremely close tolerances, and are very stable in operation.

Demodulator
The received signal is now processed by the demodulator stage where the audio signal (or other baseband signal) is recovered and then further amplified. AM demodulation requires envelope detection, which can be achieved by means of rectification and a low-pass filter (which can be as simple as an RC circuit) to remove remnants of the intermediate frequency. FM signals may be detected using a discriminator, ratio detector, or phase-locked loop. Continuous wave and single sideband signals require a product detector using a so-called beat frequency oscillator, and there are other techniques used for different types of modulation. The resulting audio signal (for instance) is then amplified and drives a loudspeaker.

When so-called high-side injection has been used, where the local oscillator is at a higher frequency than the received signal (as is common), then the frequency spectrum of the original signal will be reversed. This must be taken into account by the demodulator (and in the IF filtering) in the case of certain types of modulation such as single sideband.

Multiple conversion

To overcome obstacles such as image response, some receivers use multiple successive stages of frequency conversion and multiple IFs of different values. A receiver with two frequency conversions and IFs is called a dual conversion superheterodyne, and one with three IFs is called a triple conversion superheterodyne.

The main reason that this is done is that with a single IF there is a tradeoff between low image response and selectivity. The separation between the received frequency and the image frequency is equal to twice the IF frequency, so the higher the IF, the easier it is to design an RF filter to remove the image frequency from the input and achieve low image response. However, the higher the IF, the more difficult it is to achieve high selectivity in the IF filter. At shortwave frequencies and above, the difficulty in obtaining sufficient selectivity in the tuning with the high IFs needed for low image response impacts performance. To solve this problem two IF frequencies can be used, first converting the input frequency to a high IF to achieve low image response, and then converting this frequency to a low IF to achieve good selectivity in the second IF filter. To improve tuning, a third IF can be used.

For example, for a receiver that can tune from 500 kHz to 30 MHz, three frequency converters might be used. With a 455 kHz IF it is easy to get adequate front end selectivity with broadcast band (under 1600 kHz) signals. For example, if the station being received is on 600 kHz, the local oscillator can be set to 1055 kHz, giving an image on (-600+1055=) 455 kHz. But a station on 1510 kHz could also potentially produce an image at (1510-1055=) 455 kHz and so cause image interference. However, because 600 kHz and 1510 kHz are so far apart, it is easy to design the front end tuning to reject the 1510 kHz frequency.

However at 30 MHz, things are different. The oscillator would be set to 30.455 MHz to produce a 455 kHz IF, but a station on 30.910 would also produce a 455 kHz beat, so both stations would be heard at the same time. But it is virtually impossible to design an RF tuned circuit that can adequately discriminate between 30 MHz and 30.91 MHz, so one approach is to "bulk downconvert" whole sections of the shortwave bands to a lower frequency, where adequate front-end tuning is easier to arrange.

For example, the ranges 29 MHz to 30 MHz; 28 MHz to 29 MHz etc. might be converted down to 2 MHz to 3 MHz, there they can be tuned more conveniently. This is often done by first converting each "block" up to a higher frequency (typically 40 MHz) and then using a second mixer to convert it down to the 2 MHz to 3 MHz range. The 2 MHz to 3 MHz "IF" is basically another self-contained superheterodyne receiver, most likely with a standard IF of 455 kHz.

Modern designs
Microprocessor technology allows replacing the superheterodyne receiver design by a software-defined radio architecture, where the IF processing after the initial IF filter is implemented in software. This technique is already in use in certain designs, such as very low-cost FM radios incorporated into mobile phones, since the system already has the necessary microprocessor.

Radio transmitters may also use a mixer stage to produce an output frequency, working more or less as the reverse of a superheterodyne receiver.

Advantages and disadvantages
Superheterodyne receivers have essentially replaced all previous receiver designs. The development of modern semiconductor electronics negated the advantages of designs (such as the regenerative receiver) that used fewer vacuum tubes. The superheterodyne receiver offers superior sensitivity, frequency stability and selectivity. Compared with the tuned radio frequency receiver (TRF) design, superhets offer better stability because a tuneable oscillator is more easily realized than a tuneable amplifier. Operating at a lower frequency, IF filters can give narrower passbands at the same Q factor than an equivalent RF filter. A fixed IF also allows the use of a crystal filter or similar technologies that cannot be tuned. Regenerative and super-regenerative receivers offered a high sensitivity, but often suffer from stability problems making them difficult to operate.

Although the advantages of the superhet design are overwhelming, there are a few drawbacks that need to be tackled in practice.

Image frequency (fIMAGE)

One major disadvantage to the superheterodyne receiver is the problem of image frequency. In heterodyne receivers, an image frequency is an undesired input frequency equal to the station frequency plus (or minus) twice the intermediate frequency. The image frequency results in two stations being received at the same time, thus producing interference. Reception at the image frequency can be combated through tuning (filtering) at the antenna and RF stage of the superheterodyne receiver.

For example, an AM broadcast station at 580 kHz is tuned on a receiver with a 455 kHz IF. The local oscillator is tuned to  1035 kHz. But a signal at  1490 kHz is also 455 kHz away from the local oscillator; so both the desired signal and the image, when mixed with the local oscillator, will appear at the intermediate frequency. This image frequency is within the AM broadcast band. Practical receivers have a tuning stage before the converter, to greatly reduce the amplitude of image frequency signals; additionally, broadcasting stations in the same area have their frequencies assigned to avoid such images.

A receiver with inadequate filtering at its input will pick up signals at two different frequencies simultaneously: the desired frequency and the image frequency. A radio reception which happens to be at the image frequency can interfere with reception of the desired signal, and noise (static) around the image frequency can decrease the receiver's signal-to-noise ratio (SNR) by up to 3dB. 

Early Autodyne receivers typically used IFs of only 150 kHz or so. As a consequence, most Autodyne receivers required greater front-end selectivity, often involving double-tuned coils, to avoid image interference. With the later development of tubes able to amplify well at higher frequencies, higher IF frequencies came into use, reducing the problem of image interference. Typical consumer radio receivers have only a single tuned circuit in the RF stage.

Sensitivity to the image frequency can be minimized only by (1) a filter that precedes the mixer or (2) a more complex mixer circuit  to suppress the image; this is rarely used. In most tunable receivers using a single IF frequency, the RF stage includes at least one tuned circuit in the RF front end whose tuning is performed  in tandem with the local oscillator. In double (or triple) conversion receivers in which the first conversion uses a fixed local oscillator, this may rather be a fixed bandpass filter which accommodates the frequency range being mapped to the first IF frequency range.

Image rejection is an important factor in choosing the intermediate frequency of a receiver. The farther apart the bandpass frequency and the image frequency are, the more the bandpass filter will attenuate any interfering image signal. It may be possible to use a high enough first IF that a fixed-tuned RF stage can reject any image signals.

The ability of a receiver to reject interfering signals at the image frequency is measured by the image rejection ratio. This is the ratio (in decibels) of the output of the receiver from a signal at the received frequency, to its output for an equal-strength signal at the image frequency.

Local oscillator radiation

It can be difficult to keep stray radiation from the local oscillator below the level that a nearby receiver can detect. If the receiver's local oscillator can reach the antenna it will act as a low-power CW transmitter. Consequently, what is meant to be a receiver can itself create radio interference.

In intelligence operations, local oscillator radiation gives a means to detect a covert receiver and its operating frequency. The method was used by MI5 during Operation RAFTER. This same technique is also used in radar detector detectors used by traffic police in jurisdictions where radar detectors are illegal.

Local oscillator radiation is most prominent in receivers in which the antenna signal is connected directly to the mixer (which itself receives the local oscillator signal) rather than from receivers in which an RF amplifier stage is used in between. Thus it is more of a problem with inexpensive receivers and with receivers at such high frequencies (especially microwave) where RF amplifying stages are difficult to implement.

Local oscillator sideband noise
Local oscillators typically generate a single frequency signal that has negligible amplitude modulation but some random phase modulation which spreads some of the signal's energy into sideband frequencies. That causes a corresponding widening of the receiver's frequency response, which would defeat the aim to make a very narrow bandwidth receiver such as to receive low-rate digital signals. Care needs to be taken to minimize oscillator phase noise, usually by ensuring that the oscillator never enters a non-linear mode.

Terminology
 First detector, second detector The mixer tube or transistor is sometimes called the first detector, while the demodulator that extracts the modulation from the IF signal is called the second detector.  In a dual-conversion superhet there are two mixers, so the demodulator is called the third detector.
 RF front end Refers to all the components of the receiver up to and including the mixer; all the parts that process the signal at the original incoming radio frequency. In the block diagram above the RF front end components are colored red.

See also
 H2X radar
 Automatic gain control
 Demodulator
 Direct conversion receiver
 VFO
 Single sideband modulation (demodulation)
 Tuned radio frequency receiver
 Reflex receiver
 Optical heterodyne detection
 Superheterodyne transmitter

Notes

References

Further reading

External links 

 http://ethw.org/Superheterodyne_Receiver
 . An article giving the history of the various inventors working on the superheterodyne method.
 
  Raises Paul Laüt published six months before Lévy; Étienne published the memo.
 
  Describes English efforts.
 29F(2d)953. Armstrong v. Lévy, decided Dec. 3, 1928 http://www.leagle.com/decision/192898229F2d953_1614/ARMSTRONG%20v.%20LEVY
 An in-depth introduction to superheterodyne receivers
 Superheterodyne receivers from microwaves101.com
 Multipage tutorial describing the superheterodyne receiver and its technology

Radio electronics
Communication circuits
Electronic design
History of radio
Receiver (radio)